Rwanda is located in East Africa, to the east of the Democratic Republic of the Congo, at the co-ordinates .

At , Rwanda is the world's 149th-largest country. It is comparable in size to Haiti or the state of Massachusetts in the United States.

Rwanda is located in Central/Eastern Africa, and is bordered by the Democratic Republic of the Congo to the west, Uganda to the north, Tanzania to the east, and Burundi to the south. It lies a few degrees south of the equator and is landlocked. The capital, Kigali, is located near the centre of Rwanda.

Major geographic features

The watershed between the major Congo and Nile drainage basins runs from north to south through Rwanda, with around 80 percent of the country's area draining into the Nile and 20 percent into the Congo via the Rusizi River. The country's longest river is the Nyabarongo, which rises in the south-west, flows north, east, and southeast before merging with the Akanyaru to form the Akagera; the Akagera then flows due north along the eastern border with Tanzania. The Nyabarongo-Akagera eventually drains into Lake Victoria, and its source in Nyungwe Forest is a contender for the as-yet undetermined overall source of the Nile.

Rwanda has many lakes, the largest being Lake Kivu. Other sizeable lakes include Burera, Ruhondo, Muhazi, Rweru, and Ihema, the last being the largest of a string of lakes in the eastern plains of Akagera National Park.

Mountains dominate central and western Rwanda. These mountains are part of the Albertine Rift Mountains that flank the Albertine branch of the East African Rift. This branch runs from north to south along Rwanda's western border.

The centre of the country is predominantly rolling hills, while the eastern border region consists of savanna, plains and swamps.

Rwanda has a temperate tropical highland climate, with lower temperatures than are typical for equatorial countries due to its high elevation. There are some temperature variations across the country; the mountainous west and north are generally cooler than the lower-lying east.

There are two rainy seasons in the year. The first runs from February to June and the second from September to December. These are separated by two dry seasons: the major one from June to September, during which there is often no rain at all, and a shorter and less severe one from December to February. Rainfall varies geographically, with the west and northwest of the country receiving more precipitation annually than the east and southeast.

Political geography
Rwanda borders Burundi for 290 km, the Democratic Republic of the Congo for 217 km, Tanzania for 217 km, and Uganda for 169 km.

Physical geography
Rwanda has an area of 26 thousand square kilometers, of which 3 percent is water.

Climate 

Rwanda has a tropical savanna climate and a subtropical highland climate (Köppen climate classification Aw and Cwb/Cfb), with a wet season and a dry season.

Natural resources
Rwanda possesses the following natural resources:
gold
cassiterite (tin ore)
wolframite (tungsten ore)
columbite-tantalite (tantalum and niobium ore)
methane
hydro-electric power
coffee
tea
arable land
green beans
The use of land in Rwanda is largely for arable land, and other purposes.  40 km2 of land in Rwanda is irrigated.  The table below describes the land use in Rwanda, as of 2011.

Environment
Natural hazards in Rwanda include periodic droughts and the volcanic activity of the Virunga Mountains, located in the northwest of the country, along the border with the Democratic Republic of the Congo.

Current issues
Current issues concerning the environment in Rwanda include: the result of uncontrolled deforestation for fuel, overgrazing, soil exhaustion and widespread poaching.

International agreements
Rwanda is a party to the following international agreements:
Biodiversity
Climate Change
Climate Change-Kyoto Protocol
Desertification
Endangered Species
Hazardous Wastes
Nuclear Test Ban
Ozone Layer Protection
Wetlands
Rwanda has signed, but not ratified the United Nations Convention on the Law of the Sea.

Extreme points 

This is a list of the extreme points of Rwanda, the points that are farther north, south, east or west than any other location.

 Northernmost point - unnamed location on the border with Uganda immediately north-west of the village of Kagitumba, Eastern province
 Easternmost point - unnamed location on the border with Tanzania in the Kagera river, Eastern province
 Southernmost point - unnamed location on the border with Burundi, Southern province
 Westernmost point - unnamed location on the border with the Democratic Republic of the Congo in the Ruzizi river immediately south of the DRC town of Bukavu, Western province

See also 
 List of lakes in Rwanda

References